A list of animated television series first aired in 1983.

See also
 List of animated feature films of 1983
 List of Japanese animation television series of 1983

References

Television series
Animated series
1983
1983
1983-related lists